Ashleigh Barty and Casey Dellacqua were the defending champions, but Dellacqua retired from professional tennis in February 2018. Barty played alongside CoCo Vandeweghe, but lost in the first round to Tímea Babos and Kristina Mladenovic.

Babos and Mladenovic went on to win the title, defeating Elise Mertens and Demi Schuurs in the final, 4–6, 6–3, [10–8].

Seeds

Draw

Draw

References
 Main Draw

Birmingham Classicandnbsp;- Doubles
Doubles